Roberto Hernández Notario (born 8 April 1964) is a Chilean football manager.

In 2011, he was Chile national team youth series’ director of football.

References

1964 births
Living people
Chilean football managers
Chilean Primera División managers
Deportes La Serena managers
O'Higgins F.C. managers
Audax Italiano managers
Universidad de Chile managers
Colo-Colo managers
Unión Española managers